Poleta is an unincorporated community in Inyo County, California.

A post office operated at Poleta from 1895 to 1923.

References

Unincorporated communities in California
Unincorporated communities in Inyo County, California